Carex flacca, with common names blue sedge, gray carex, glaucous sedge,  or carnation-grass, (syn. Carex glauca), is a species of sedge native to parts of Europe and North Africa. It is frequent in a range of habitats, including grasslands, moorlands, exposed and disturbed soil, and the upper edges of salt marshes. It has naturalized in eastern North America.

Description
The arching leaves are about as long as the inflorescence, . The plant spreads in expanding clumps by lateral shoots rooting. Most stems have two male spikes, close together and often looking like one at first glance. They are densely packed on the spike, not loose and gappy like Carex panicea. Female spikes are typically two, and can be short-stalked and upright, or longer-stalked and nodding.

Cultivation
Carex flacca is cultivated by plant nurseries as an ornamental plant, planted for accent or as a groundcover in gardens and public landscapes. It is also used in drought tolerant landscaping and erosion control plantings. It grows in sun to part shade settings.

References

flacca
Flora of Europe
Flora of North Africa
Plants described in 1771
Garden plants of Africa
Garden plants of Europe
Drought-tolerant plants
Groundcovers
Taxa named by Johann Christian Daniel von Schreber